Crotyl alcohol, or crotonyl alcohol, is an unsaturated alcohol.  It is a colourless liquid that is moderately soluble in water and miscible with most organic solvents. Two isomers of this alcohol exist, cis and trans.

It can be synthesized by the hydrogenation of crotonaldehyde.  The compound is of little commercial interest.

See also
Crotyl
 Allyl alcohol
 Crotonaldehyde
 Crotonic acid

References

Primary alcohols
Alkene derivatives
Crotyl compounds